Consortium Project is a Dutch progressive metal band. The band, formed in 1999, is a super-group project led by Ian Parry. The group, currently signed with Lion Music, has released five albums. The group has featured many notable artists, such as Thomas Youngblood of Kamelot.

Discography
Ian Parry's Consortium Project (1999) 
Consortium Project II - Continuum in Extremis (2001)
Consortium Project III - Terra Incognita (The Undiscovered World) (2003)
Consortium Project IV - Children of Tomorrow (2007)
Consortium Project V - Species (2011)

External links
http://ianparry.com/

Dutch heavy metal musical groups
Musical groups established in 1999
Musical quintets
1999 establishments in the Netherlands